Satta Bazaar is a 1959 Indian Hindi-language film starring Meena Kumari and Balraj Sahni in lead roles. The music of the film was composed by Kalyanji Anandji.

Plot
Ramesh (Balraj Sahni) is a widower who lives with his young daughter Kala. In order to give Kala, a mother's love, Ramesh marries Jamuna (Meena Kumari) much to the displeasure of Kala.
Jamuna continues to strive to care and love her as her own, despite giving birth to a baby boy.
After some years, a grown up Kala (Vijaya Chowdhury) falls in love with Shyam (Suresh), the son of Ramesh's business partner Bholanath (Asit Sen) who belongs to a different caste. Ramesh disapproves the match but is eventually convinced by Jamuna and the couple gets formally engaged. After the engagement, Ramesh soon meets Badri Prasad (Ramayan Tiwari), a multi-millionaire and starts investing in Stock exchange. While on the verge of bankruptcy, Badri offers him help in lieu of Kala's hand for his son Pritam. Will Ramesh sacrifice Kala's happiness to avoid meeting a terrible fate?

Cast
 Balraj Sahni as Ramesh
 Meena Kumari as Jamna
 Johnny Walker as Jagat
 Asit Sen as Bholanath
 Ramayan Tiwari as Badri Prasad
 Moolchand as Chaman Lal
 Suresh as Shyam
 Vijaya Chowdhury as Kala

Crew
Director – Ravindra Dave
Producer – Ravindra Dave	
Story – Mohanlal G. Dave
Dialogues – Khwaja Ahmad Abbas
Screenplay – Khwaja Ahmad Abbas
Cinematography	– W. V. Mukadam
Music – Kalyanji Anandji
Lyrics – Shailendra, Hasrat Jaipuri, Indeevar, Gulshan Bawra
Playback Singers – Hemant Kumar, Lata Mangeshkar, Mohammad Rafi, Suman Kalyanpur

Soundtrack
The film had nine songs in it. The music of the film was composed by Kalyanji Anandji. Shailendra, Hasrat Jaipuri, Gulshan Bawra and Indeevar wrote the lyrics.

 "Aankde Ka Dhandha" - Mohammad Rafi. Lyrics by: Gulshan Bawra
 "Chaandi Ke Chand Tukadon Ke Liye" - Hemant Kumar. Lyrics by: Gulshan Bawra
 "Zaraa Theharo Ji" - Suman Kalyanpur, Mohammad Rafi. Lyrics by: Hasrat Jaipuri
 "Tumhe Yaad Hoga" - Lata Mangeshkar, Hemant Kumar. Lyrics by: Gulshan Bawra
 "Ja Ja Na Chhed Maan Bhi Ja" - Mohammad Rafi, Suman Kalyanpur. Lyrics by: Shailendra
 "Kehti Hai Meri Aankhe" - Lata Mangeshkar. Lyrics by: Hasrat Jaipuri
 "Kya Raha Jaane Ko" - Lata Mangeshkar. Lyrics by: Indeevar
 "Kaisa Insaf Tera" - Lata Mangeshkar. Lyrics by: Indeevar
 "Ye Duniya Rang Badalti Hai"

References

Dpboss
 Satta King  is also an acronym for Satta Bazaar.

 Satta King  Satta market is also short form power is a game to be played.

1959 films
1950s Hindi-language films

 Satta King transmitted from the New York Cotton Ex to the Bombay Cotton Ex.